The Eight Mountains of Kowloon are eight prominent mountains in Hong Kong that serve as a natural border between the Kowloon area and the New Territories. The eight mountains are: Kowloon Peak, Tung Shan, Tate's Cairn, Temple Hill, Unicorn Ridge, Lion Rock, Beacon Hill and Crow's Nest. 

Incidentally, the name Kowloon stems from the term nine (kow) dragons (loon), alluding to the eight mountains plus a Chinese emperor, the Emperor Bing of Song, who had fled to Hong Kong after being targeted by Mongol troops. In Ancient China, the Emperor used to be revered like a dragon and was the only person who could wear robes depicting a dragon.

See also 
 List of mountains, peaks and hills in Hong Kong
 Wilson Trail
 Gin Drinker's Line

References

External links 

 Wilson Trail